Mardan is a city in Pakistan. 

Mardanmay also refer to:

Places

Pakistan 
 Mardan Division, Khyber Pakhtunkhwa province
 Mardan District, one of two districts in the division
 Mardan Tehsil, an administrative subdivision (tehsil) of Mardan District
 Mardan Cantonment, a cantonment in the centre of the city of Mardan

Iran 
 Mardan, Iran, a village

People 
 Mardan Mamat (born 1967), Singaporean golfer
 Mardan Musayev (1907–1982), Azerbaijani Red Army senior sergeant and Hero of the Soviet Union
 Azad Ari Mardan (born 1972), Indian politician
 Mihr Mardan (died 755), third ruler of the Iranian Bavand dynasty

Other uses 
 Mardan (film), a 2014 Iraqi drama film directed by Batin Ghobadi
 Mardan Palace, a luxury hotel in Lara, Antalya, Turkey
 Mardan Sports Complex, a multi-purpose stadium in Aksu, Antalya, Turkey

See also
 Mardin (disambiguation)

Masculine given names